Factor IX (or Christmas factor) is one of the serine proteases of the coagulation system; it belongs to peptidase family S1. Deficiency of this protein causes haemophilia B. It was discovered in 1952 after a young boy named Stephen Christmas was found to be lacking this exact factor, leading to haemophilia.

Coagulation factor IX is on the World Health Organization's List of Essential Medicines.

Physiology 

Factor IX is produced as a zymogen, an inactive precursor.  It is processed to remove the signal peptide, glycosylated and then cleaved by factor XIa (of the contact pathway) or factor VIIa (of the tissue factor pathway) to produce a two-chain form, where the chains are linked by a disulfide bridge.  When activated into factor IXa, in the presence of Ca2+, membrane phospholipids, and a Factor VIII cofactor, it hydrolyses one arginine-isoleucine bond in factor X to form factor Xa.

Factor IX is inhibited by antithrombin.

Factor IX expression increases with age in humans and mice. In mouse models, mutations within the promoter region of factor IX have an age-dependent phenotype.

Domain architecture 

Factors VII, IX, and X all play key roles in blood coagulation and also share a common domain architecture. The factor IX protein is composed of four protein domains: the Gla domain, two tandem copies of the EGF domain and a C-terminal trypsin-like peptidase domain which carries out the catalytic cleavage.

The N-terminal EGF domain has been shown to at least in part be responsible for binding tissue factor. Wilkinson et al. conclude that residues 88 to 109 of the second EGF domain mediate binding to platelets and assembly of the factor X activating complex.

The structures of all four domains have been solved. A structure of the two EGF domains and the trypsin-like domain was determined for the pig protein. The structure of the Gla domain, which is responsible for Ca(II)-dependent phospholipid binding, was also determined by NMR.

Several structures of 'super active' mutants have been solved, which reveal the nature of factor IX activation by other proteins in the clotting cascade.

Genetics 

The gene for factor IX is located on the X chromosome (Xq27.1-q27.2) and is therefore X-linked recessive: mutations in this gene affect males much more frequently than females. At least 534 disease-causing mutations in this gene have been discovered. The F9 gene was first cloned in 1982 by Kotoku Kurachi and Earl Davie.

Polly, a transgenic cloned Poll Dorset sheep carrying the gene for factor IX, was produced by Dr Ian Wilmut at the Roslin Institute in 1997.

Role in disease 

Deficiency of factor IX causes Christmas disease (hemophilia B). Over 3000 variants of factor IX have been described, affecting 73% of the 461 residues; some cause no symptoms, but many lead to a significant bleeding disorder. The original Christmas disease mutation was identified by sequencing of Christmas' DNA, revealing a mutation which changed a cysteine to a serine.
Recombinant factor IX is used to treat Christmas disease. Formulations include:

 nonacog alfa (brand name BeneFix)
 albutrepenonacog alfa (brand name Idelvion)
 eftrenonacog alfa (brand name Alprolix)
 nonacog beta pegol (brand name Refixia)

Some rare mutations of factor IX result in elevated clotting activity, and can result in clotting diseases, such as deep vein thrombosis. This gain of function mutation renders the protein hyperfunctional and is associated with familial early-onset thrombophilia.

Factor IX deficiency is treated by injection of purified factor IX produced through cloning in various animal or animal cell vectors. Tranexamic acid may be of value in patients undergoing surgery who have inherited factor IX deficiency in order to reduce the perioperative risk of bleeding.

A list of all the mutations in Factor IX is compiled and maintained by EAHAD.

Coagulation factor IX is on the World Health Organization's List of Essential Medicines.

References

Further reading

External links 
 
 
 
 
 
 
  GeneReviews/NCBI/NIH/UW entry on Hemophilia B
 The MEROPS online database for peptidases and their inhibitors: S01.214

Coagulation system
EC 3.4.21
Peripheral membrane proteins
Pfizer brands
Zymogens
Sanofi
World Health Organization essential medicines